Frank Cooper (October 1, 1869 – July 16, 1946) was a United States district judge of the United States District Court for the Northern District of New York.

Education and career

Born in Glenville, New York, Cooper received an Artium Baccalaureus degree from Union College in 1893, and read law in 1895. He received an Artium Magister degree from Union College in 1896, and was in private practice of law in Schenectady, New York from 1895 to 1920. He served as corporation counsel for Schenectady from 1910 to 1913, in 1916, in 1917, and in 1920.

Federal judicial service

Cooper was nominated by President Woodrow Wilson on April 29, 1920, to the United States District Court for the Northern District of New York, to a new seat created by 40 Stat. 1156. He was confirmed by the United States Senate on June 3, 1920, and received his commission the same day. He assumed senior status on September 30, 1941. His service was terminated on July 16, 1946, due to his death in Albany, New York.

References

Sources
 

1869 births
1946 deaths
Judges of the United States District Court for the Northern District of New York
United States district court judges appointed by Woodrow Wilson
20th-century American judges
People from Schenectady County, New York
United States federal judges admitted to the practice of law by reading law